Phytomyptera tarsalis is a species of bristle fly in the family Tachinidae. It is found in North America.

References

Further reading

External links

 

Tachininae